Jan Riise (born 1957) is a Swedish politician. He was elected as Member of the Riksdag in September 2022. He represents the constituency of Halland County. He is affiliated with the Green Party.

References 

Living people
1957 births
Place of birth missing (living people)
21st-century Swedish politicians
Members of the Riksdag 2022–2026
Members of the Riksdag from the Green Party